Moving Out is a 1983 film about a young Italian-Australian adolescent in Melbourne directed by Michael Pattinson.

Pattinson met Jan Sardi, who was a school teacher wanting to move into writing. They discussed making the movie as a 50-minute film and it evolved into a feature. Most of the money was raised privately except for $50,000 from the Australian Film Commission.

The movie was shot over six weeks in various schools in inner Melbourne. It was shot on 16 mm and blown up to 35mm.

References

External links
Moving Out at IMDb
Moving Out at Oz Movies

Australian drama films
1980s English-language films
1980s Australian films